Choctaw may refer to either of the following places in the U.S. state of Mississippi:
Choctaw, Bolivar County, Mississippi
Choctaw, Neshoba County, Mississippi